The Galt Rockets were a junior ice hockey team based in Galt, Ontario, now a part of the city of Cambridge. They played in the Ontario Hockey Association from 1947 to 1949. Their home arena was the Galt Arena Gardens.

Originally the Galt Red Wings, the team became the Galt Rockets after NHL sponsorship ended in 1947. After finishing last place in the second season, the team was rescued by another NHL sponsorship, this time from the Chicago Black Hawks. The Rockets became the Galt Black Hawks in 1949.

NHL alumni
From the Galt Rockets, four players graduated to play in the National Hockey League.

 Bronco Horvath
 Harry Pidhirny
 Don Simmons
 Bill Wylie

Yearly results

External links
 www.cambridgehockey.com - The History of Cambridge Hockey by Todd Jones
 Galt Arena Gardens - OHL Arena & Travel Guide
 Ontario Hockey League Official web site
 Canadian Hockey League Official web site

Sport in Cambridge, Ontario
Defunct Ontario Hockey League teams
Ice hockey clubs established in 1947
1947 establishments in Ontario
1949 disestablishments in Ontario
Ice hockey clubs disestablished in 1949